The Karen National Union (abbreviated KNU) is a political organisation with an armed wing, the Karen National Liberation Army (KNLA), that claims to represent the Karen people of Myanmar (Burma). It operates in mountainous eastern Myanmar, and has underground networks in other areas of Myanmar where Karen people live as a minority group. In the Karen language, this area is called Kawthoolei. Some of the Karen, led primarily by the Karen National Union (KNU), have waged a war against the central government since early 1949. The aim of the KNU at first was independence. Since 1976 the armed group has called for a federal system rather than an independent Karen State.

The Karen conflict is the longest internal war in the world, having been waged since 31 January 1949.

History

1947 – 1959 
The KNU was founded in 1947. Following Burmese independence in January 1948, KNU leaders instructed local organisers to establish local defence militias, collectively grouped under the Karen National Defence Organisation in their districts. The KNU launched its armed campaign against the Burmese government in early 1949.

By the early 1950s, factions within Karen politics were influencing the strategic posture of the KNU. In 1953, Mahn Ba Zan and other KNU leaders established the Karen National Unity Party (KNUP), a communist-influenced group that supported a shift leftwards in KNU politics.

1960 – 1969 
By 1960, KNUP members had become the dominant figures within KNU structures, despite the KNUP being a "minority" tendency within Karen politics. The KNUP was strongest in the Irrawaddy Delta.

Under KNUP influence, the KNU was centralised, the KNLA was reorganised along Maoist lines, and agricultural cooperatives were created in some KNU-controlled villages.

By 1963, the KNU numbered approximately 10,000.

As the KNU trended leftwards internally, its outwards posture was complicated by the broader alignment of forces within Burma. Chinese support for the Communist Party of Burma – a rival of the KNU – led the organisation into a tacit understanding with the Kuomintang, which had been displaced into northern Burma following defeat in the Chinese Civil War.

Ideological and strategic disagreement precipitated the breaking away of senior figure Tha Hmwe in April 1963, with approximately 400 men, to found the Karen Revolutionary Council (KRC). The KRC was wound-up following Tha Hmwe's capture in 1964.

In KNU-controlled territory along the Thai border, a more successful reaction against the KNUP influence within the KNU took place. These areas, at some distance from KNUP strength in the Irrawaddy Delta, had come under the sway of Sgaw Karen figures, especially commanders Shwe Hser and Bo Mya.

In 1966, Bo Mya – then head of the Karen Armed Force's Eastern Division – seized control of the Dawna Range and much of the Thai border region and ordered KNUP cadres to leave his territory. Bo Mya was able to maintain an army approximately 10,000 men by taxing illegal trade along the border with Thailand.

In 1967, Mahn Ba Zan and four other senior KNUP officials reconciled with Bo Mya, forming the Karen National Unity Front (KNUF). This reconciliation paved the way both for Bo Mya's ultimate ascension to KNU presidency in 1976.

1970 – 1999 
By 1970, following KNUP military defeats in the Irrawaddy Delta, the KNU had become the dominant representative body for the Karen Movement.

The 9th KNU congress was held in September 1974, and the 11th KNU congress was held in 1995.

Bo Mya dominated the KNU leadership for three decades from 1976 to 2000. For many years, the KNU was able to fund its activities by controlling black market trade across the border with Thailand, and through local taxation. After the failed 8888 Uprising of the Burmese people in 1988, the Burmese military government turned to China for help in consolidating its power. Various economic concessions were offered to China in exchange for weapons. The Burmese Army was massively expanded and began to offer deals to groups fighting the government. The groups were offered the choice of co-operating with the military junta or being destroyed.

In 1994, a group of Buddhist soldiers in the KNLA, citing discrimination by the KNU's overwhelmingly Christian leadership against the Buddhist Karen majority, broke away and established the Democratic Karen Buddhist Army (DKBA). They were led by a monk. The DKBA quickly agreed to a ceasefire with the Burmese army and was granted business concessions at the expense of the KNU . The KNU and DKBA have since been in regular fighting, with the DKBA actively supported by the Burmese army.

The KNU's effectiveness was severely diminished after its headquarters were captured in the Fall of Manerplaw, near the Thai border, in 1995.

2000 – 2009 
The 12th KNU congress was held in 2000, the 13th KNU congress was held from 12 to 16 December 2005, and the 14th KNU congress was held from 6 to 20 October 2008.

Padoh Mahn Sha La Phan, the secretary-general of the union was shot dead in his home in Mae Sot, Thailand, on 14 February 2008, possibly by soldiers of the DKBA.

In 2009, the KNU's fighting force was reduced to around 3000 to 5000 soldiers, and on 25 June 2009 the KNLA's Brigade 7 headquarters was overrun.

2010 – present 
On 2 November 2010, the Karen National Union became a member of an alliance which included the Karenni National Progressive Party (KNPP), the Chin National Front (CNF), the Kachin Independence Organisation (KIO), the New Mon State Party (NMSP) and the Shan State Army – North (SSA-N).

In January 2012, Myanmar's military-backed civilian government signed a ceasefire deal with the KNU in Hpa-an, the capital of eastern Kayin State. Aung Min, the Railway Minister, and General Mutu Sae Poe of the KNU led the peace talks. 

In March 2012, a senior political leader of KNU, P'doh Mahn Nyein Maung, was found guilty of high treason under the Illegal Association Act, for his involvement with the Karen rebellion and sentenced to 20 years. He was freed soon afterward and sent back to Thailand.

The Karen National Union held its 15th congress at Lay Wah on 26 November 2012. This meeting was held at a pivotal moment in the KNU's history, as it occurred at a time of political in-fighting in regards to how the KNU should negotiate a ceasefire agreement with the Burmese government.

From 30 October to 2 November 2013, an unprecedented meeting took place at the Kachin Independence Organisation headquarters in Laiza. For the first time, representatives of 17 armed ethnic opposition groups were able to meet in Myanmar with the consent of the government. The conference resulted in the formation of a 13-member Nationwide Ceasefire Coordinating Team (NCCT) and the signing of an "11-Point Common Position of Ethnic Resistance Organisations on Nationwide Ceasefire" or the Laiza Agreement. The NCCT's current mandate was to take responsibility on writing the nationwide ceasefire document based on mutual understanding between the different armed groups in the NCCT. However, at the Law Khee Lah Conference, it was agreed that the NCCT had the mandate to discuss and change the document technically, except at the policy level. When the final document was ready, the respective ethnic organisation leaders decided and discussed with the Union Peacemaking Working Committee (UPWC) on the nationwide ceasefire.

On 15 October 2015, the KNU signed the Nationwide Ceasefire Agreement (NCA) with the government of Myanmar, along with several other insurgent groups.

In September 2016, KNLA fighters began clashing with members of the Mon National Liberation Army (MNLA), the armed wing of the New Mon State Party (NMSP), in the Tanintharyi Region. Both the KNU and NMSP were signatories of the Nationwide Ceasefire Agreement (NCA) at the time of the fighting. A temporary bilateral truce was reached between the two groups on 14 March 2018.

Tensions between the KNU and the Tatmadaw increased as unrest swept the country following the 2021 Myanmar coup d'état. On 27 March 2021, KNU Brigade 5 overran a Myanmar Army base near the Thai border, killing 10 soldiers including a deputy battalion commander.  The Myanmar army launched multiple airstrikes on Karen villages in retaliation. In 2021, KNU became a member of the National Unity Consultative Council.

Leadership 
The Karen National Union leadership is a democratically elected body with individuals elected at a four-yearly congress. The KNU Congress is recognised as the KNU's supreme legislative body and it is here that the President, vice-president, General Secretary, Joint Secretaries 1 and 2 and the Central Executive Committee (CEC), the Central Standing Committees (CSC) and candidate members are elected. The seven KNU districts are responsible for electing their own District Chairmen and District Standing Committee leaders every two years. As the District Chairmen and Brigade Commanders are elected at local levels, they are automatically appointed as Central Standing Committee Members. The District Chairmen and  Brigade Commanders together with nominated District Standing Committee Members attend the KNU congresses. In addition, elected Central Standing Committee members would provide the ministers for 14 Departments including Culture, Defence, Education, Forestry, Foreign Affairs, Health, and Mining. The CEC is made up of 11 members that are responsible for the day-to-day running of the KNU. The CSC meets annually, however, when issues arise that either directly affects the KNU policies and/or the existence of the KNU organisation, the CEC will call a CSC Emergency Meeting.

Additionally, the Foreign Affairs Department appoints KNU representatives. These representatives are based among the Karen communities who support KNU's political goals and objectives in their respective countries.

The incumbent leaders elected at the 15th KNU Congress are:

Central Executive Committee
 Chairperson: General Saw Mutu Say Poe
 Vice-chairperson: P'doh Kwe Htoo Win
 General Secretary: P'doh Ta Doh Moo
 First Secretary: P'doh Saw Hser Bweh
 Second Secretary: P'doh Saw Hla Tun
 Other CEC members: General Saw Johny, P'doh Saw Th'mein Tun, P'doh Naw Dah Dah, P'doh Mahn Nyein Maung, P'doh Saw Roger Khin

Department heads:
 Head of the Agriculture Department: P'doh Saw Lay Say
 Head of the Alliance Affairs Department: P'doh Mahn Nyne Maung
 Head of the Breeding and Fishery Department: P'doh Saw Mya Maung
 Head of the Defense Department: Lt. Col. Saw Roger Khin
 Head of the Education and Culture Department: P'doh Saw Lah Say
 Head of the Finance and Revenue Department: P'doh Saw Thaw Thi
 Head of the Forestry Department: P'doh Mahn Ba Tun
 Head of the Foreign Affairs Department: P'doh Saw Tony
 Head of the Health and Welfare Department: P'doh Saw Eh Kalu Shwe Oo
 Head of the Interior and Religion Department: P'doh Saw Ah Toe
 Head of the Organisation and Information Department: P'doh Saw Hla Tun
 Head of the Justice Department: P'doh Naw Myne Poe
 Head of the Mining Department: P'doh Saw Ker Ler
 Head of the Transportation and Communication Department: P'doh Saw Kawkasar Nay Soe

References

External links 
 Armed-groups: KNU
 KNU homepage
 http://www.karenwomen.org/
 Revolution Reviewed: The Karens' Struggle for Right to Self-determination and Hope for the Future Saw Kapi, 26 February 2006, retrieved on 2006-11-30
 Fifty Years of Struggle: A Review of the Fight for the Karen People's Autonomy (abridged) Ba Saw Khin, 1998 (revised 2005), Retrieved on 2006-11-30
 Determined Resistance: An Interview with Gen. Bo Mya The Irrawaddy, October 2003, Retrieved on 2006-11-30
 Karen Heritage Karen History and Culture Preservation Society
 Karen National Union Homepage
 Karen Martyrs' Day Marked by Calls for Unity Saw Yan Naing, The Irrawaddy, 13 August 2008
 Remembering our heroes and rethinking the revolution Saw Kapi, Mizzima, 13 August 2008

History of Myanmar
Karen people
Political parties in Myanmar
Politics of Myanmar
Rebel groups in Myanmar
Secessionist organizations in Asia
1947 establishments in Burma
Separatism in Myanmar